The Dallas Wings are an American basketball team based in Arlington, Texas. The Wings play in the Western Conference in the Women's National Basketball Association (WNBA). The team is owned by a group which is led by chairman Bill Cameron. Greg Bibb is president and CEO. 
Brad Hilsabeck joined the Dallas Wings ownership group in March 2019 with the acquisition of Mark Yancey’s interest in the Wings.

The team was founded in Auburn Hills, Michigan, before the 1998 WNBA season began and moved to Tulsa, Oklahoma, before the 2010 season; on July 20, 2015, Cameron announced that the franchise would move to Arlington for the 2016 WNBA season.

The franchise has been home to players such as shooting guard Deanna Nolan, one of women's basketball's all-time leading scorers Katie Smith, Cheryl Ford, Skylar Diggins-Smith, Odyssey Sims, and Australian center Liz Cambage.

Franchise history

The Detroit Shock (1998–2009)

The Shock were one of the first WNBA expansion teams and began play in 1998. The Shock quickly brought in a blend of rookies and veterans, but only qualified for the postseason once in its first five years of existence. The Shock went through two coaches (hall of famer Nancy Lieberman and Greg Williams) before hiring former Detroit Pistons legend Bill Laimbeer. There were rumors the Shock would fold after the team's awful 2002 season. Laimbeer convinced the owners to keep the team for another year, certain that he could turn things around. The Shock would finish the next season with a 25–9 record and defeated the two-time defending champion Los Angeles Sparks in the 2003 WNBA Finals. Detroit became the first team in league history to go from last place one season to WNBA champions the next season.

After a couple seasons of losing in the first round of the playoffs, the Detroit Shock returned to success and would appear in three straight Finals from 2006 to 2008. They won the WNBA championship in 2006 over the Sacramento Monarchs and 2008 over the San Antonio Silver Stars, but lost to the Phoenix Mercury in 2007.

The Tulsa Shock (2010–2015)

Tulsa had been mentioned as a possible future city for WNBA expansion, but efforts did not come together until the middle of 2009. An organizing committee with Tulsa businesspeople and politicians began the effort to attract an expansion team. The group was originally given a September 1 deadline, however, WNBA President Donna Orender extended that deadline into October. The investment group hired former University of Arkansas head coach Nolan Richardson as the potential franchise general manager and head coach, and on October 15, 2009, the group made its official request to join the league.

On October 20, 2009, WNBA President Donna Orender, lead investors Bill Cameron and David Box, Tulsa mayor Kathy Taylor, Oklahoma governor Brad Henry, and head coach Nolan Richardson were present for a press conference announcing that the Detroit Shock would relocate to Tulsa. On January 23, 2010, the franchise announced that the team would remain as the Shock but the colors were changed to black, red, and gold.

On July 20, 2015, majority owner Bill Cameron announced he was moving the team to Dallas-Fort Worth.

Dallas Wings (2016–present)

On July 23, 2015, WNBA League owners unanimously approved the Tulsa Shock's relocation to the Dallas-Fort Worth Metroplex to play out of the College Park Center at the University of Texas at Arlington. College Park Center is also home to the UT Arlington Mavericks basketball and volleyball teams. At a press conference at College Park Center on November 2, 2015, it was announced that the team was renamed the Dallas Wings.

Uniforms
Uniforms were revealed at the First Annual Wings Draft Party April 14, 2016. The light uniforms were primarily lime green while the dark uniforms were predominantly blue. As a result of a league-wide initiative for its 20th season, all games featured all-color uniform matchups, thus no white uniforms were unveiled for this season.

Season-by-season records

Players

Current roster

Former Players 
Sorted by Team They Last Played For

Detroit Shock
 Jennifer Azzi (1999)
 Carla Boyd (1998–1999, 2001)
 Sandy Brondello (1998–1999), now the head coach of the New York Liberty and the Australia national team
 Dominique Canty (1999–2002)
 Swin Cash (2002–2007), now the Vice President of Basketball Operations and Team Development for the New Orleans Pelicans
 Barbara Farris (2000–2005, 2009) 
 Cheryl Ford (2003–2008)
 Tasha Humphrey (2008)
 Shannon Johnson (2007)
 Taj McWilliams-Franklin (2008–2009)
 Astou Ndiaye-Diatta (1999–2003)
 Deanna Nolan (2001–2009)
 Wendy Palmer (1999–2002)
 Elaine Powell (2002–2008)
 Ruth Riley (2003–2006)
 Sheri Sam (2008)
 Katie Smith (2005–2009), now an assistant coach for the Minnesota Lynx

Tulsa Shock
 Kara Braxton (2005–2010)
 Alexis Hornbuckle (2008–2010)
 Temeka Johnson (2012)
 Marion Jones (2010–2011)
 Ivory Latta (2007, 2010–2012)
 Kayla Pedersen (2011–2013)
 Nicole Powell (2013), now the head coach of the UC Riverside Highlanders women's basketball
 Sheryl Swoopes (2011)
 Shavonte Zellous (2009–2010)

Dallas Wings
 Glory Johnson (2012–2019) 
 Skylar Diggins-Smith (2013–2019) now with the Phoenix Mercury
 Liz Cambage (2018), now with the Las Vegas Aces
 Odyssey Sims (2014–2016), now a member of the Atlanta Dream

Coaches and staff

Owners
 William Davidson, owner of the Detroit Pistons (1998–2009)
 Tulsa Pro Hoops LLC, composed of Bill Cameron, David Box, Chris Christian, Sam and Rita Combs, and Paula Marshall.
 Bill Cameron (majority owner) is chairman and Chris Christian is vice chairman/managing partner and Mark Yancey (2015–present)

Head coaches

General managers
 Nancy Lieberman (1998–2000)
 Greg Williams (2000–2002)
 Bill Laimbeer (2002–2009)
 Cheryl Reeve (2009)
 Nolan Richardson (2010–2011)
 Teresa Edwards (2011)
 Gary Kloppenburg (2012–2013)
 Fred Williams (2014–2015)
 Greg Bibb (2016–present)

Assistant coaches

 Steve Smith (1998–2001)
 Greg Williams (1998–2000)
 Tom Cross (2001–2002)
 Frank Schneider (2002)
 Laurie Byrd (2003–2005)
 Pam McGee (2003)
 Korie Hlede (2004)
 Rick Mahorn (2005–2009)
 Cheryl Reeve (2006–2009)
 Tammy Bagby (2010)
 Wayne Stehlik (2010–2011)
 Teresa Edwards (2011)
 Tracy Murray (2011)
 Kathy McConnell-Miller (2011–2012)
 Jason Glover (2012–2013)
 Stacey Lovelace-Tolbert (2013)
 Bridget Pettis (2014–2017)
 Ed Baldwin (2014–2016)
 Taj McWilliams-Franklin (2017–2018)
 Erin Phillips (2018–2020)
 Travis Charles (2018–2020)
 Crystal Robinson (2019–2020)
 Le'Coe Willingham (2021–2022)
 Kelly Schumacher (2021–2022)
 Tim Gittens (2021–2022)
 Brandi Poole (2023–Present)
 April (McDivitt) Schilling (2023–Present)
 Courtney Paris (2023–Present)

Hall of Famers
 Nancy Lieberman, enshrined 1996
 Lynette Woodard, enshrined 2004

Statistics

|-
| 1998
| S. Brondello (14.2)
| C. Brown (10.0)
| S. Brondello (3.3)
| 69.6 vs 69.3
| 35.9 vs 31.6
| .411 vs .411
|-
| 1999
| S. Brondello (13.3)
| V. Whiting-Raymond (6.7)
| J. Azzi (3.8)
| 70.0 vs 72.0
| 31.1 vs 32.2
| .401 vs .437
|-

|-
| 2000
| W. Palmer (13.8)
| W. Palmer (6.8)
| D. Canty (2.9)
| 72.8 vs 75.8
| 30.8 vs 30.3
| .438 vs .460
|-
| 2001
| A. Ndiaye-Diatta (11.8)
| W. Palmer (7.0)
| E. Brown (2.7)
| 65.7 vs 70.9
| 29.5 vs 30.7
| .404 vs .462
|-
| 2002
| S. Cash (14.8)
| S. Cash (6.9)
| D. Canty (3.0)
| 66.1 vs 70.8
| 33.7 vs 30.7
| .399 vs .417
|-
| 2003
| S. Cash (16.6)
| C. Ford (10.4)
| E. Powell (3.9)
| 75.1 vs 70.4
| 36.2 vs 31.3
| .450 vs .399
|-
| 2004
| S. Cash (16.4)
| C. Ford (9.6)
| E. Powell (4.5)
| 69.6 vs 70.0
| 34.4 vs 31.0
| .417 vs .410
|-
| 2005
| D. Nolan (15.9)
| C. Ford (9.8)
| D. Nolan (3.7)
| 66.1 vs 67.3
| 35.7 vs 29.9
| .403 vs .403
|-
| 2006
| C. Ford (13.8)
| C. Ford (11.3)
| D. Nolan (3.6)
| 74.3 vs 70.1
| 37.8 vs 31.9
| .414 vs .388
|-
| 2007
| D. Nolan (16.3)
| S. Cash (6.1)
| D. Nolan (3.9)
| 79.3 vs 74.7
| 38.6 vs 32.0
| .430 vs .396
|-
| 2008
| D. Nolan (15.8)
| C. Ford (8.7)
| D. Nolan (4.4)
| 78.6 vs 74.2
| 36.7 vs 31.9
| .424 vs .405
|-
| 2009
| D. Nolan (16.9)
| C. Ford (7.4)
| D. Nolan (3.5)
| 78.0 vs 77.8
| 36.1 vs 32.4
| .430 vs .410
|-

|-
| 2010
| I. Latta (12.4)
| C. Black (6.5)
| I. Latta (3.9)
| 78.0 vs 89.8
| 31.6 vs 37.5
| .424 vs .470
|-
| 2011
| T. Jackson (12.4)
| T. Jackson (8.4)
| I. Latta (3.2)
| 69.2 vs 82.1
| 30.7 vs 32.6
| .396 vs .484
|-
| 2012
| I. Latta (14.3)
| G. Johnson (6.8)
| T. Johnson (4.7)
| 77.2 vs 84.2
| 29.5 vs 37.1
| .405 vs .477
|-
| 2013
| L. Cambage (16.3)
| G. Johnson (8.9)
| S. Diggins (3.8)
| 77.0 vs 79.2
| 32.8 vs 35.7
| .405 vs .451
|-
| 2014
| S. Diggins-Smith (20.1)
| C. Paris (10.2)
| S. Diggins-Smith (5.0)
| 81.3 vs 83.3
| 34.6 vs 33.8
| .428 vs .468
|-
| 2015
| S. Diggins-Smith (17.8)
| C. Paris (9.3)
| S. Diggins-Smith (5.0)
| 77.7 vs 77.1
| 35.6 vs 33.6
| .395 vs .445
|-
| 2016
| O. Sims (14.0)
| G. Johnson (8.9)
| O. Sims (3.9)
| 82.6 vs 88.2
| 34.1 vs 36.2
| .400 vs .476
|-
| 2017
| S. Diggins-Smith (18.5) 
| G. Johnson (9.1)
| S. Diggins-Smith (5.8) 
| 86.1 vs 88.8
| 34.5 vs 34.7
| .406 vs .481
|-
| 2018
| L. Cambage (23.0)
| L. Cambage (9.7)
| S. Diggins-Smith (6.2) 
| 86.6 vs 85.4
| 36.6 vs 32.2
| .441 vs .448
|-
| 2019
| A. Ogunbowale (19.1)
| I. Harrison (5.8)
| A. Ogunbowale (3.2) 
| 71.6 vs 77.4
| 33.9 vs 33.5
| .389 vs .430
|-

|-
| 2020
| A. Ogunbowale (22.8)
| S. Sabally (7.8)
| A. Ogunbowale (3.5) 
| 83.4 vs 87.0
| 32.7 vs 36.5
| .415 vs .471
|-
| 2021
| A. Ogunbowale (18.7)
| I. Harrison / S. Sabally (5.9)
| A. Ogunbowale (3.3)
| 81.1 vs. 81.7
| 36.1 vs. 33.6
| .420 vs. .449
|-
| 2021
| A. Ogunbowale (19.7)
| T. McCowan (7.0)
| M. Mabrey (3.7)
| 82.9 vs. 82.8
| 33.8 vs. 32.7
| .435 vs. .459
|-

Media coverage
Previously, while in Tulsa, some Shock games were broadcast locally on The Cox Channel (COX). The broadcasters for the Shock games were Mike Wolfe and Shanna Crossley. 

Currently, Bally Sports Southwest or Bally Sports Southwest Plus broadcast the majority of games. The 2016 broadcasts featured sportscaster Ron Thulin and Raegan Pebley, the former WNBA player and current head coach of Texas Christian University's women's basketball team, on the call. All games (excluding blackout games, which are available on ESPN3.com) are broadcast to the WNBA LiveAccess game feeds on the league website. Furthermore, some games are broadcast nationally on ESPN, ESPN2, CBS, CBS Sports Network and ABC.

All-time notes

Regular season attendance
 A sellout for a basketball game at The Palace of Auburn Hills (Detroit) is 22,076.
 A sellout for a basketball game at BOK Center (Tulsa) is 17,839.
 A sellout for a basketball game at College Park Center (Dallas) is 7,000

Draft picks
 1998 Expansion Draft: Rhonda Blades (1), Tajama Abraham (3), Tara Williams (5), Lynette Woodard (7)
 1998: Korie Hlede (4), Rachael Sporn (14), Gergana Branzova (24), Sandy Brondello (34)
 1999: Jennifer Azzi (5), Val Whiting (17), Dominique Canty (29), Astou Ndiaye-Diatta (41)
 2000: Edwina Brown (3), Tamicha Jackson (8), Chevonne Hammond (44), Cal Bouchard (60)
 2001: Deanna Nolan (6), Jae Kingi (22), Svetlana Volnaya (38), Kelly Santos (54)
 2002: Swin Cash (2), Lanae Williams (18), Ayana Walker (20), Jill Chapman (21), Kathy Wambe (22), Ericka Haney (47)
 2003 Miami/Portland Dispersal Draft: Ruth Riley (1)
 2003: Cheryl Ford (3), Kara Lawson (5), Syreeta Bromfield (28)
 2004 Cleveland Dispersal Draft: Jennifer Rizzotti (13)
 2004: Iciss Tillis (11), Shereka Wright (13), Erika Valek (23), Jennifer Smith (32)
 2005: Kara Braxton (7), Dionnah Jackson (13), Nikita Bell (20), Jenni Lingor (33)
 2006: Ambrosia Anderson (17), Zane Teillane (35)
 2007 Charlotte Dispersal Draft: selection waived
 2007: Ivory Latta (11)
 2008: Alexis Hornbuckle (4), Tasha Humphrey (11), Olayinka Sanni (18), Natasha Lacy (28), Valeriya Berezhynska (42)
 2009 Houston Dispersal Draft: selection waived
 2009: Shavonte Zellous (11), Brittany Miller (18), Tanae Davis-Cain (37)
 2010 Sacramento Dispersal Draft: Scholanda Robinson (7)
 2010: Amanda Thompson (19), Vivian Frieson (31)
 2011: Liz Cambage (2), Kayla Pedersen (7), Italee Lucas (21), Chastity Reed (25)
 2012: Glory Johnson (4), Riquna Williams (17), Vicki Baugh (25), Lynetta Kizer (29)
 2013: Skylar Diggins (3), Angel Goodrich (29)
 2014: Odyssey Sims (2), Jordan Hooper (13), Theresa Plaisance (27)
 2015: Amanda Zahui B. (2), Brianna Kiesel (13), Mimi Mungedi (25)
 2016: Aerial Powers (5), Ruth Hamblin (18), Shakena Richardson (30)
 2017: Evelyn Akhator (3), Allisha Gray (4), Kayla Davis (10), Breanna Lewis (23), Saniya Chong (26)
 2018: Azurá Stevens (6), Loryn Goodwin (18), Natalie Butler (30)
 2019: Arike Ogunbowale (5), Megan Gustafson (17), Kennedy Burke (22), Morgan Bertsch (29)
 2020: Satou Sabally (2), Bella Alarie (5), Tyasha Harris (7), Luisa Geiselsöder (21)
 2021: Charli Collier (1), Awak Kuier (2), Chelsea Dungee (5), Dana Evans (13)
2022: Veronica Burton (7), Jasmine Dickey (30), Jazz Bond (31)

Trades
 July 29, 1999: The Shock traded Korie Hlede and Cindy Brown to the Utah Starzz in exchange for Wendy Palmer and Olympia Scott-Richardson.
 April 24, 2000: The Shock traded Jennifer Azzi and the 12th pick in the 2000 Draft to the Utah Starzz in exchange for the third and eighth picks in the 2000 Draft.
 April 20, 2001: The Shock traded Val Whiting to the Minnesota Lynx in exchange for a second-round pick in the 2002 Draft.
 April 24, 2001: The Shock traded Anna DeForge to the Houston Comets in exchange for Jennifer Rizzotti.
 May 13, 2001: The Shock traded Tamicha Jackson to the Portland Fire in exchange for a second-round pick in the 2002 Draft.
 May 27, 2001: The Shock traded Jennifer Rizzotti to the Cleveland Rockers in exchange for a third-round pick in the 2002 Draft.
 May 27, 2001: The Shock traded Olympia Scott-Richardson and a third-round pick in the 2002 Draft to the Indiana Fever in exchange for a second-round pick in the 2002 Draft.
 May 3, 2002: The Shock traded Claudia das Neves to the Phoenix Mercury in exchange for a fourth-round pick in the 2003 Draft.
 May 11, 2002: The Shock traded a fourth-round pick in the 2003 Draft to the Sacramento Monarchs in exchange for Stacy Clinesmith.
 July 7, 2002: The Shock traded Wendy Palmer and a second-round pick in the 2003 Draft to the Orland Miracle in exchange for Elaine Powell and a first-round pick in the 2003 Draft.
 April 27, 2003: The Shock traded Dominique Canty to the Houston Comets in exchange for Allison Curtin.
 April 28, 2003: The Shock traded Edwina Brown and Lanae Williams to the Phoenix Mercury in exchange for Telisha Quarles and Petra Ujhelyi.
 April 29, 2003: The Shock traded Kara Lawson to the Sacramento Monarchs in exchange for Kendra Holland-Corn.
 May 19, 2003: The Shock traded a third-round pick in the 2004 Draft to the Minnesota Lynx in exchange for Tamara Moore.
 July 31, 2003: The Shock traded Tamara Moore to the Phoenix Mercury in exchange for Stacey Thomas.
 February 11, 2004: The Shock traded Kendra-Holland Corn and the 26th pick in the 2004 Draft to the Houston Comets in exchange for the 11th and the 32nd picks in the 2004 Draft.
 April 17, 2004: The Shock traded Shereka Wright, Sheila Lambert and Erika Valek to the Phoenix Mercury in exchange for Chandi Jones.
 April 14, 2005: The Shock traded Iciss Tillis to the Washington Mystics in exchange for the 13th pick in the 2005 Draft.
 June 29, 2005: The Shock traded Andrea Stinson and a second-round pick in the 2006 Draft to the Phoenix Mercury in exchange for Plenette Pierson.
 July 30, 2005: The Shock traded Chandi Jones, Stacey Thomas, and a first-round pick in the 2006 Draft to the Minnesota Lynx in exchange for Katie Smith and a second-round pick in the 2006 Draft.
 April 5, 2006: The Shock traded Ambrosia Anderson and a second-round pick in the 2007 Draft to the Minnesota Lynx in exchange for Jacqueline Batteast and a third-round pick in the 2007 Draft.
 May 18, 2006: The Shock traded two third-round picks in the 2007 Draft to the Phoenix Mercury in exchange for Angelina Williams.
 February 22, 2007: The Shock traded Ruth Riley to the San Antonio Silver Stars in exchange for Katie Feenstra and the right to swap first-round picks in the 2008 Draft.
 February 6, 2008: The Shock traded Ivory Latta to the Atlanta Dream in exchange for LaToya Thomas and the 18th pick in the 2008 Draft.
 February 19, 2008: The Shock traded Swin Cash to the Seattle Storm in exchange for the fourth pick in the 2008 Draft.
 June 22, 2008: The Shock traded LaToya Thomas to the Minnesota Lynx in exchange for Eshaya Murphy.
 August 12, 2008: The Shock traded Eshaya Murphy, Tasha Humphrey, and a second-round pick in the 2009 Draft to the Washington Mystics in exchange for Taj McWilliams-Franklin.
 April 9, 2009: The Shock traded Ashley Shields to the Atlanta Dream in exchange for the 18th pick in the 2009 Draft.
 April 7, 2010: The Shock traded the seventh pick in the 2010 Draft and a second-round pick in the 2011 Draft to the Connecticut Sun in exchange for Chante Black and Amber Holt.
 April 14, 2010: The Shock traded Crystal Kelly to the San Antonio Silver Stars in exchange for Shanna Crossley.
 May 27, 2010: The Shock traded Shavonte Zellous to the Indiana Fever in exchange for a second-round pick in the 2011 Draft.
 June 14, 2010: The Shock traded Plenette Pierson to the New York Liberty in exchange for Tiffany Jackson.
 July 22, 2010: The Shock traded Kara Braxton to the Phoenix Mercury in exchange for Nicole Ohlde and a first-round pick in the 2011 Draft.
 July 26, 2010: The Shock traded Alexis Hornbuckle to the Minnesota Lynx in exchange for Rashanda McCants.
 February 1, 2011: The Shock traded a second-round pick in the 2012 Draft to the Los Angeles Sparks in exchange for Andrea Riley.
 May 2, 2011: The Shock traded Scholanda Robinson to the San Antonio Silver Stars in exchange for second- and third-round picks in the 2012 Draft.
 January 12, 2012: The Shock traded Andrea Riley to the Phoenix Mercury in exchange for Temeka Johnson.
 July 2, 2012: The Shock traded Karima Christmas to the Indiana Fever in exchange for Roneeka Hodges.
 March 1, 2013: The Shock traded Deanna Nolan, a second-round pick, and a third-round pick in the 2013 Draft to the New York Liberty in exchange for Nicole Powell. As part of the three-team trade, the Shock also traded their second-round pick in the 2014 Draft to the Minnesota Lynx in exchange for Candice Wiggins.
 June 20, 2013: The Shock traded Kayla Pedersen to the Connecticut Sun in exchange for a second-round pick in the 2014 Draft.
 March 1, 2016: The Wings traded Riquna Williams and the 6th pick in the 2016 Draft to the Los Angeles Sparks in exchange for Erin Phillips, the 5th pick in the 2016 Draft, and a first-round pick in the 2017 Draft.
 May 11, 2016: The Wings traded Amanda Zahui B. and a second-round pick in the 2017 Draft to the New York Liberty in exchange for a first-round pick in the 2017 Draft.
 February 17, 2017: The Wings traded Odyssey Sims and the 11th pick in the 2017 Draft to the Los Angeles Sparks in exchange for the 4th overall pick and a second-round pick in the 2017 Draft.
 July 23, 2018: The Wings traded Ariel Powers to the Washington Mystics for Tayler Hill, and a 2019 second round draft pick, with the option to trade first round picks.
 May 16, 2019 The Wings traded Liz Cambage to the Las Vegas Aces for Moriah Jefferson, Isabelle Harrison, the Aces' first and second round picks in the 2020 Draft.
 May 16, 2019 The Wings traded their third round pick in the 2020 Draft to Atlanta Dream for Imani McGee-Stafford.
 February 12, 2020 The Wings traded Skylar Diggins-Smith to Phoenix in exchange for the 5th and 7th picks in the 2020 Draft and Phoenix's first round pick in the 2021 Draft.
 February 12, 2020 The Wings traded the first round pick in the 2021 Draft acquired from Phoenix to Chicago in exchange for Astou Ndour.
 February 14, 2020 The Wings traded Azurá Stevens to Chicago in exchange for Chicago's first round pick in the 2021 Draft and Katie Lou Samuelson.
 February 21, 2020 The Wings traded their second round pick in the 2021 Draft to Los Angeles in exchange for Marina Mabrey.
 April 15, 2020 In a three team trade, the Wings acquired Washington's first round pick in the 2021 Draft and New York's second round pick in the 2021 Draft in exchange for Tayler Hill, the 9th pick, and the 15th pick of the 2020 Draft.
 May 26, 2020 The Wings traded a third round pick in the 2021 Draft and Kristine Anigwe to Los Angeles for a second round pick in the 2021 Draft.
 February 10, 2021 The Wings traded Katie Lou Samuelson and a second round pick in the 2022 Draft to Seattle in exchange for the first pick in the 2021 Draft.
 April 14, 2021 The Wings traded the seventh pick in the 2021 Draft and a second round pick in the 2022 Draft to Los Angeles for a first round pick in the 2022 Draft.
 June 2, 2021 The Wings traded Dana Evans to Chicago in exchange for Chicago's third round pick in the 2022 Draft, the right to swap 2022 first round picks, and Shayla Heal.
 March 8, 2022 The Wings traded the 4th and 6th picks in the 2022 Draft and their first round pick in the 2023 Draft for Teaira McCowan, the 7th pick in the 2022 Draft and the Chicago Sky's First Round pick in the 2023 Draft.

All-Stars

 1999: Sandy Brondello
 2000: Wendy Palmer
 2001: None
 2002: None
 2003: Swin Cash, Cheryl Ford, Deanna Nolan
 2004: Cheryl Ford, Deanna Nolan
 2005: Swin Cash, Cheryl Ford, Deanna Nolan, Ruth Riley
 2006: Cheryl Ford, Deanna Nolan, Katie Smith
 2007: Kara Braxton, Cheryl Ford, Deanna Nolan
 2008: No All-Star Game
 2009: Katie Smith
 2010: None
 2011: Liz Cambage
 2012: No All-Star Game
 2013: Glory Johnson
 2014: Skylar Diggins, Glory Johnson
 2015: Skylar Diggins, Plenette Pierson, Riquna Williams
 2016: No All-Star Game
 2017: Skylar Diggins-Smith
 2018: Liz Cambage, Skylar Diggins-Smith
 2019: None
 2020: No All-Star Game
 2021: Arike Ogunbowale, Satou Sabally
 2022: Arike Ogunbowale

Olympians

 2004: Swin Cash, Ruth Riley
 2008: Katie Smith
 2012: Liz Cambage (AUS)
 2016: Erin Phillips (AUS)
 2020: Allisha Gray

Honors and awards

 1998 All-WNBA Second Team: Cindy Brown
 2003 Finals MVP: Ruth Riley
 2003 Rookie of the Year: Cheryl Ford
 2003 Coach of the Year: Bill Laimbeer
 2003 All-WNBA Second Team: Swin Cash
 2003 All-WNBA Second Team: Cheryl Ford
 2003 All-WNBA Second Team: Deanna Nolan
 2004 All-WNBA Second Team: Swin Cash
 2005 All-Defensive Second Team: Deanna Nolan
 2006 Finals MVP: Deanna Nolan
 2006 All-WNBA Second Team: Deanna Nolan
 2006 All-Defensive Second Team: Cheryl Ford
 2006 All-Defensive Second Team: Deanna Nolan
 2007 All-Star Game MVP: Cheryl Ford
 2007 Sixth Woman of the Year: Plenette Pierson
 2007 All-Defensive First Team: Deanna Nolan
 2008 Finals MVP: Katie Smith
 2008 All-WNBA Second Team: Deanna Nolan
 2008 All-Defensive Second Team: Deanna Nolan
 2008 All-Defensive Second Team: Katie Smith
 2009 All-WNBA Second Team: Deanna Nolan
 2009 All-Defensive Second Team: Deanna Nolan
 2009 All-Rookie Team: Shavonte Zellous
 2011 All-Rookie Team: Liz Cambage
 2012 All-Rookie Team: Glory Johnson
 2012 All-Rookie Team: Riquna Williams
 2013 Sixth Woman of the Year: Riquna Williams
 2013 All-Defensive Second Team: Glory Johnson
 2013 All-Rookie Team: Skylar Diggins
 2014 Most Improved Player: Skylar Diggins
 2014 Peak Performer (Rebounds): Courtney Paris
 2014 All-WNBA First Team: Skylar Diggins
 2014 All-Rookie Team: Odyssey Sims
 2015 Peak Performer (Rebounds): Courtney Paris
 2016 All-Rookie Team: Aerial Powers
 2017 Rookie of the Year: Allisha Gray
 2017 All-Rookie Team: Kayla Davis
 2018 All-WNBA First Team: Liz Cambage
 2018 All-WNBA Second Team: Skylar Diggins-Smith
 2018 Peak Performer (Points): Liz Cambage
 2019 All-Rookie Team: Arike Ogunbowale
 2020 Peak Performer (Points): Arike Ogunbowale
 2020 All-WNBA First Team: Arike Ogunbowale
 2020 All-Rookie Team: Satou Sabally
 2021 All-WNBA Second Team: Arike Ogunbowale

References

External links

 
Women's National Basketball Association teams
Basketball teams established in 1998
Sports in Arlington, Texas
Basketball teams in Texas
1998 establishments in Michigan
Relocated Women's National Basketball Association teams